Aedhuar Ua Dubhda (died 1059) was King of Ui Fiachrach Muaidhe.

Annanlistic references

 1059. Aedhvar Ua Dubhda, lord of Ui-Amhalghadha, was slain by his own tribe.

External links

 http://www.ucc.ie/celt/published/T100005B/

References

 The History of Mayo, Hubert T. Knox, p. 379, 1908.

People from County Sligo
Monarchs from County Mayo
11th-century Irish monarchs